Kirtilals is a diamond jewellery retailer with a large presence in South Indian cities.

History
The first store was founded in 1939 on Raja Street in Coimbatore. They added online ordering on their website in 2017.

References

Jewellery retailers of India